Kingsized is the sixth studio album from Denver quartet Dressy Bessy. The album was released on Yep Roc Records in February 2016.

Peter Buck and Scott McCaughey guest on the album.

Track listing
All tracks composed by Tammy Ealom
"Lady Liberty"
"Get Along (Diamond Ring)"
"Electrified"
"These Modern Guns"
"Pop Phenom"
"Kingsized"
"Cup 'o Bang Bang"
"Giddyup"
"Honey Bee"
"Make Mine Violet"
"57 Disco"
"Dirty Birdies"
"Say Goodbye"
"In Particular"

References

2016 albums
Dressy Bessy albums
Yep Roc Records albums